Round Bush can mean: The Act Of Having A Round Shrubbery.
 Round Bush, Hertfordshire
 Round Bush, Essex